Benjamin Jack Wiles (born 17 April 1999) is an English professional footballer who plays as a midfielder for  club Rotherham United.

Early life
Wiles was born in Rotherham, South Yorkshire and attended Kilnhurst Primary School.

Career
Wiles began his career at Rotherham United, progressing through the club's youth academy before signing a one-year professional contract on 1 June 2017. He joined Northern Premier League Division One South club Frickley Athletic on 10 August 2017 on a one-month youth loan, where he made five appearances. Upon returning, he made his first-team debut for Rotherham on 3 October in a 2–1 loss at home to Chesterfield in the EFL Trophy.

Wiles scored his first professional goal on 31 August 2019 in the League One game against Tranmere Rovers.

Career statistics

Honours
Rotherham United
League One runner-up: 2021–22
EFL Trophy: 2021–22
Individual

 Rotherham United Young Player of the Season: 2019–20

References

External links
Profile at the Rotherham United F.C. website

1999 births
Living people
Footballers from Rotherham
English footballers
Association football midfielders
Rotherham United F.C. players
Frickley Athletic F.C. players
Northern Premier League players
English Football League players